The 2007 Ryedale District Council election to the Ryedale District Council was held on 3 May 2007.  The whole council was up for election and the council stayed under no overall control. One seat was vacant in Pickering East until a by-election in June.

Election result

|}

3 Independent, 2 Conservative and 1 Liberal Democrat candidates were unopposed.

Ward results

External links
2007 Ryedale election result
Articles on the Ryedale 2007 election
Ward results
Shock as Ryedale leader loses seat

2007
2007 English local elections
2000s in North Yorkshire